Ferenc Nógrádi, born as Ferenc Neuwirth (15 November 1940 – 19 May 2009) was a former Hungarian footballer who played for Budapest Honvéd FC as a striker.

Olympic career
Nógrádi won a gold medal with the Hungarian Olympic team at the 1964 Summer Olympics, at which he played in four out of five games.

Honours

Club

 Hungarian Cup (1): 1964

Olympic
 Gold medal (1): 1964

References

External links
 

1940 births
2009 deaths
Hungarian footballers
Olympic footballers of Hungary
Olympic gold medalists for Hungary
Olympic medalists in football
Footballers at the 1964 Summer Olympics
Medalists at the 1964 Summer Olympics
Budapest Honvéd FC players
Association football forwards
Sportspeople from Košice
Hungary international footballers